Rostilovo is a rural locality (a village) and the administrative center of Rostilovskoye Rural Settlement, Gryazovetsky District, Vologda Oblast, Russia. The population was 564 as of 2002. There are 3 streets.

Geography 
Rostilovo is located 9 km south of Gryazovets (the district's administrative centre) by road. Basargino is the nearest rural locality.

References 

Rural localities in Gryazovetsky District